Fofão is a fictional character from the Brazilian children's TV series Balão Mágico and TV Fofão. He was portrayed by the Brazilian actor and humorist Orival Pessini. He became a hit amongst Brazilian kids in the early 1980s, having his own TV show, discs, dolls and many licensed products.

The character's first appearance was in the morning children's television program Balão Mágico in 1983, as a supporting character to the children's musical group. However, the character became very popular, arriving to become one of the icons of Brazilian media during the 80s, mainly due to high sales of a plush toy based on the character. After the end of the original program in 1986, the character won a solo program in the same year, broadcast by Rede Bandeirantes until 1989, called TV Fofão (with a return between 1994–1996). The last appearance of the character on television was in 1998 by the channel CNT Gazeta.

In 1989, the character starred in a theatrical movie titled . The character has also led to several other licensed products and sold numerous albums of children's songs during the 80s and 90s.

Creation
According to Orival Pessini, Fofão was created at the request of TV Globo director José Bonifácio de Oliveira Sobrinho (a.k.a. Boni), who needed a child character for the program Balão Mágico, which would debut in a few months, and any character that was created would go on the air. Orival had never worked with children and had no idea what to create, imagined various possibilities, such as a dog, a pig, a clown, a teddy bear, an extraterrestrial or a human being, after thinking he decided to mix all the imagined alternatives, resulting in Fofão. Other inspiration that Orival had to create Fofão was Steven Spielberg's E.T, which according him "was very ugly, with disgusting appearance and his head looked like as inverted foot, but he had a great heart and was very charismatic", so decided to create a similar character.

Controversy and legacy
At the end of the 1980s an urban legend about the plush toy of the character became quite controversial. The legend claimed that the doll had a knife inside of its body, supposedly meant for evil rituals and killing children. The doll has even been compared to Chucky from Child's Play horror film series. In recent years the mystery was partially confirmed when it was revealed that the doll had a pointed hard plastic object as its spinal chord.

In 2016, Fofão was again popular on the internet, when a group of street performers titled “Carreta Furacão” became a popular meme in Brazil. The group features several amateur artists, dressed up as fictional characters of popular culture, like Popeye, Captain America, Mickey Mouse, Fofão himself, and a generic clown. Videos of the artists dancing and performing acrobatics on the streets were popular on YouTube and became a meme on the internet. Fofão was considered the most prominent character to be used by the artists like a leader; however, Orival Pessini made a protest against the group, prohibiting the use of his character in political affairs. Some changes were then made to the generic character from the group.

On October 14, 2016, Fofão creator Orival Pessini died of spleen cancer, aged 72.

References

External links 
 

Television characters introduced in 1983
Fictional Brazilian people
Brazilian clowns
Children's music
Stuffed toys
Fictional hybrid life forms
Extraterrestrial characters in television
Internet memes introduced in 2016